Minipenetretus is a genus of ground beetles in the family Carabidae. This genus has a single species, Minipenetretus quadraticollis. It is found in China.

References

Carabidae